Subrata Chatterjee (1941–2004) was an Indian actress, who is recognized for her work in Bengali cinema. Her on-screen pairings with actors such as Uttam Kumar, Soumitra Chatterjee, and Anil Chatterjee were popular.

Career
Subrata Chatterjee  was born on 18 July 1941 in Kolkata, India. She debuted in Bengali movie Sosur Bari in 1953 and acted more than 200 films. She actually acted as a supporting actress in most of her films.

Selected filmography

Awards
 Won, Bengal Film Journalists' Association – Best Supporting Actress Award  for Chiriakhana (1967)

References

External links
 

Actresses from West Bengal
1940 births
Actresses in Bengali cinema
20th-century Indian actresses
2004 deaths